Allan Collins may refer to:
 Allan Collins (Australian rules footballer) (1919–2006)
 Allan Collins (filmmaker), Australian filmmaker, known for Beneath Clouds (2002)
 Allan Collins (Scottish footballer) (1918–2002), Kilmarnock FC player
 Max Allan Collins (born 1948), American mystery writer
 Allan M. Collins, cognitive and education scientist

See also
Allen Collins (1952–1990), American musician
Alan Collins (disambiguation)
Alan Collins or Alan Collin, pseudonyms of actor Luciano Pigozzi